Tarkan may refer to:

People
 Tarkan (name), a given name (including a list of people with the name)
 Tarkan (singer) (born 1972), Turkish pop singer

Other uses 
 Tarkhan, an ancient Turkic and Mongol nobility title
 Tarkan (comics), a fictional Hunnic warrior created by Turkish cartoonist Sezgin Burak
 Tarkhan (Punjab), a social group with origins in India living in Pakistan and north of India
 Tarkhan Dynasty or Turkhan Dynasty, a dynasty established by the Turkic Tarkhan ruling Sindh, Pakistan from 1554 to 1591
 Tarkhan (Egypt), an ancient Egyptian site and necropolis
 Tarkan (album), 1999 compilation album by the Turkish singer Tarkan